Mladý Svět (Young World) was a magazine published in Czechoslovakia and the Czech Republic. It contained editorials, comics and other works. It is not very well known outside of the Czech Republic and Slovakia but inside these countries the magazine enjoyed great success and popularity.

The writer and feuilletonist Rudolf Křesťan worked as an editor in the magazine from 1964 to 1993. During 1972, Mladý svět published the popular comics Lips Tullian.

References

External links

1958 establishments in Czechoslovakia
2005 disestablishments in the Czech Republic
Czech-language magazines
Defunct magazines published in the Czech Republic
Magazines established in 1958
Magazines disestablished in 2005
Magazines published in Prague